Crash Team Rumble is an upcoming multiplayer online battle arena video game developed by Toys for Bob and published by Activision slated for release in 2023. The game is the third in the party genre in the Crash Bandicoot series, and features several members of its cast as playable characters. The gameplay pits two teams of players against each other as they stockpile Wumpa Fruit while impeding the opposing team's efforts.

Gameplay
Crash Team Rumble is a team-based four-versus-four multiplayer online battle arena in which a number of Crash Bandicoot characters are playable, including Crash, Cortex, Coco, Dingodile, Brio, and Tawna. Players must capture more Wumpa Fruit than the other team to claim victory. In addition to depositing their own Wumpa Fruit at a drop-off zone, players must also defend their opponent's drop-off zone to prevent them from depositing their own supply. Each character has unique skills and abilities with which to battle the opposing team. The game will feature cross-platform play.

Marketing and release
On October 7, 2022, Activision delivered a package to influencers consisting of a pizza box with an attached receipt announcing the release of Crash Bandicoot 4: It's About Time via Steam on October 18. A message at the bottom of the receipt teased the announcement of a new Crash Bandicoot title on December 8, the date of The Game Awards 2022. At the awards ceremony, Crash Team Rumble was announced via a debut trailer, with a projected 2023 release for the PlayStation 4, PlayStation 5, Xbox One, and Xbox Series X/S. It is the latest Crash Bandicoot title to be developed by Toys for Bob after Crash Bandicoot 4: It's About Time.

References

External links
 Official website

Activision games
Crash Bandicoot games
Multiplayer online battle arena games
PlayStation 4 games
PlayStation 5 games
Toys for Bob games
Upcoming video games scheduled for 2023
Video games developed in the United States
Video games set in Australia
Video games with cross-platform play
Xbox One games
Xbox Series X and Series S games